South Dakota Highway 101 (SD 101) is a short highway linking the town of Gary to State Highway 22. It was commissioned in 1975, and had previously had been a spur of Highway 22.

Route description
South Dakota Highway 101 begins at a junction with South Dakota Highway 22 in Herrick Township. The road travels north paralleling the Minnesota state line, entering the town of Gary, South Dakota as Herrick Street. Highway 101 has intersections with Washington Avenue and Prospect Avenue, and ends at CR 310/Main Avenue in Gary. 

Major intersections

References

101
Transportation in Deuel County, South Dakota